Pseudocycnidae is a family of crustaceans belonging to the order Siphonostomatoida.

Genera:
 Cybicola Bassett-Smith, 1898
 Noetiphilus Pearse, 1947
 Pseudocycnus Heller, 1865

References

Siphonostomatoida